Trioxane refers to any of three isomeric organic compounds composed of a six-membered ring with three carbon atoms and three oxygen atoms, having the molecular formula C3H6O3.

The three isomers are:
 1,2,3-trioxane, a hypothetical compound that is the parent structure of the molozonides,
 1,2,4-trioxane, a hypothetical compound whose skeleton occurs as a structural element of some antimalarial agents (artemisinin and similar drugs),
 1,3,5-trioxane, a trimer of formaldehyde used as fuel and in plastics manufacture, and also as a solid fuel tablet when combined with Hexamine.

References

 
Hypothetical chemical compounds